The 1898 Boston Beaneaters season was the 28th season of the franchise. The Beaneaters won their second straight National League pennant and their eighth overall. It was also their fifth, and last, of the decade. This team has been cited (along with the 1880s St. Louis Browns and the 1890s Baltimore Orioles) as one of the greatest of the 19th century. This was the end of a tremendous run of success for the team, which won four straight National Association titles (1872–1875) and eight National League pennants (1877-78, 1883, 1891-93, 1897-98).

The starting line-up featured three Hall of Famers: third baseman Jimmy Collins and outfielders Billy Hamilton and Hugh Duffy. Collins led the league with 15 home runs, and Hamilton hit .369 with 54 stolen bases. The pitching staff was led by Hall of Famers Kid Nichols and Vic Willis. Nichols led the NL with 31 wins and had an ERA of 2.13.

Regular season

Season standings

Record vs. opponents

Roster

Player stats

Batting

Starters by position 
Note: Pos = Position; G = Games played; AB = At bats; H = Hits; Avg. = Batting average; HR = Home runs; RBI = Runs batted in

Other batters 
Note: G = Games played; AB = At bats; H = Hits; Avg. = Batting average; HR = Home runs; RBI = Runs batted in

Pitching

Starting pitchers 
Note: G = Games pitched; IP = Innings pitched; W = Wins; L = Losses; ERA = Earned run average; SO = Strikeouts

Other pitchers 
Note: G = Games pitched; IP = Innings pitched; W = Wins; L = Losses; ERA = Earned run average; SO = Strikeouts

Awards and honors

League top ten finishers 
Jimmy Collins
 NL leader in home runs (15)
 #2 in NL in RBI (111)
 #2 in NL in slugging percentage (.479)

Hugh Duffy
 #4 in NL in RBI (108)

Sliding Billy Hamilton
 NL leader in on-base percentage (.480)
 #2 in NL in batting average (.369)
 #2 in NL in stolen bases (54)

Kid Nichols
 NL leader in wins (31)
 #3 in NL in ERA (2.13)
 #4 in NL in strikeouts (138)

Vic Willis
 #3 in NL in strikeouts (160)

References 
1898 Boston Beaneaters season at Baseball Reference

Boston Beaneaters seasons
Boston Beaneaters
Boston Beaneaters
19th century in Boston
National League champion seasons